In 2011, eight Brazilian films drew more than a million people to theaters. All of the 2011 Brazilian films together received an audience of nearly 19 million people. Brazil produced nearly 100 films in 2011, up from 30 in 2001 and less than five in 1994.

Highest-grossing
These were the top ten Brazilian films in 2011. The films are ranked according to public.

2011 releases

See also
2011 in Brazil
2011 in Brazilian television

References

2011
Films
Brazil